The 1989 Island Games in the Faroe Islands was the 1st edition in which a men's football tournament was played at the multi-games competition. It was contested by 5 teams.

The Faroe Islands won the tournament for the first time.

Participants

Final rankings

Matches

Top goalscorers

11 goals
 Bergur Magnussen

4 goals
 Jens Erik Rasmussen

3 goals
 Gray

External links
Official 1989 website

1989
1989
1989–90 in European football
1989 in Faroe Islands football